George Graf Dickerson, Jr. (July 25, 1933 – January 10, 2015) was an American actor, writer, and poet.

Biography

Dickerson was born July 25, 1933, in Topeka, Kansas, to George Graf Dickerson, a lawyer, and Elizabeth Dickerson (née Naumann), parents he did not have a good relationship with. He had one brother, five years his junior. As a child, his family lived in Michigan, the South Side of Chicago, Queens, New York, and Virginia. From 1965, he lived in the same apartment in Manhattan, one once rented by critic James Agee, whom Dickerson claimed to have spiritual contact with.

Dickerson served in the U.S. Army from December 1953 to the fall of 1954. He graduated from Yale University in 1955, after studying with novelist and poet Robert Penn Warren and Cleanth Brooks, advocates of New Criticism. After working a teaching job in Vermont, Dickerson read his poems at venues with Beatnik poets such as Gregory Corso, Diane di Prima, and Ted Joans. His poetry was praised by novelist Norman Mailer.

He maintained long term friendships with many well-known artists, including songwriter Leonard Cohen, actor Richard Widmark, playwright Arthur Miller, actor Roscoe Lee Browne, opera soprano Leontyne Price, Edna St. Vincent Millay’s sister, Norma Ellis, John Farrar, and ex-Poet Laureate Mark Strand.

In the 1970s, after a decade in the literary world, Dickerson worked as Press Secretary and speech writer for U.S. Congressman Robert Steele (R- Connecticut), and Head of Press and Publications for UNRWA (the United Nations Relief and Works Agency for Palestine Refugees in the Near East) at its headquarters in Beirut, Lebanon, where he experienced the Lebanese Civil War in 1975 and 1976.

Dickerson married four times and had five children: two daughters by his first wife, a son by his third wife, a daughter by his fourth wife, and a son born out of wedlock with a Finnish journalist; Finnish film director Dome Karukoski. He was romantically involved with 1960s supermodel Veruschka.

Dickerson spoke five languages: English, French, German, Arabic, and Italian. While not religious, he claims a belief in God. He suffered from Crohn's disease.

Dickerson was a Democrat, and only once voted Republican, for former New York City mayor John V. Lindsay. Of his politics, Dickerson said, 'I wasn’t involved in the Civil Rights movement. That is a failure on my part. I wasn’t really political until I started writing about world affairs for Time. I didn’t see my Black friends as black and they sensed that, so the subject didn’t come up between us, as hard as that may be to believe. We talked about what close friends talk about when there are no issues between them…struggles with their writing, with their wives…."

Dickerson died after a long illness in early 2015, surrounded by the people closest to him. His death was made public by his son Dome via Facebook on January 13, 2015.

Writing

By 1960, Dickerson was working at the Macmillan Publishing Company. He then worked at Time magazine, The New Yorker, and Story magazine. While reviewing literature for Time, Dickerson helped to promote the careers of such young writers (at that time) as John Irving, Cormac McCarthy, Donald Barthelme, Robert Stone, and Don DeLillo.

Dickerson published several short stories and began an uncompleted novel. His short story Chico appeared in The Best American Short Stories of 1963, and was praised by poet e.e. cummings. His short story A Mussel Named Ecclesiastes appeared in The Best American Short Stories of 1966. He was also published in The New Yorker, Mademoiselle, The Saturday Evening Post, Cosmopolitan, and Penthouse.

After his time in Lebanon, Dickerson suffered from Post-Traumatic Stress Disorder (PTSD) and suffered a decades long bout of writer's block. By the mid-1990s, Dickerson began to write poetry again. A book of his, Selected Poems, was published in 2000, by Rattapallax publishing company and journal, which he helped to found. Dickerson has also written drama, including a one-man play, A Few Useless Mementos For Sale.

Acting

Dickerson returned from Lebanon to the United States and became an actor, taking roles in the television series Hill Street Blues, as Police Commander Swanson, and Detective Williams in David Lynch's film Blue Velvet (1986). He also featured in the soap opera Search for Tomorrow, as well as local theater and independent films, such as Broken Giant, Ties to Rachel, and Stranger in the Kingdom. He had major roles in films like Psycho II (1983), Space Raiders (1983), The Star Chamber (1983), No Mercy (1986), Death Wish 4: The Crackdown (1987), After Dark, My Sweet (1990), and Death Warrant (1990). Dickerson also guest starred on episodes of shows like Three's Company, Charlie's Angels, Little House On The Prairie, L.A. Law, and Sledge Hammer!.

Dickerson was a member of SAG, AFTRA, Actors' Equity, the Dramatists' Guild, the Author's Guild, the Academy of American Poets, and AMPAS.

Filmography

References

External links

George Dickerson Film Reference page
George Dickerson at kuttymovies
Song for Suzanne by George Dickerson 

1933 births
2015 deaths
American male poets
Poets from Kansas
Male actors from Kansas
People from Topeka, Kansas
United States Army soldiers
Yale University alumni
American male television actors
American male film actors
20th-century American male actors
20th-century American poets
20th-century American male writers